Bernard Wilfrid Reidy is a retired first-class cricketer. Born in Whalley, Lancashire in 1953, he played for Lancashire in first-class cricket from 1973 to 1982 and played his last one day match in 1989. A burly left-handed all rounder, he took 60 first-class wickets with his medium paced swing and scored 3641 runs at 26.77 with 2 centuries and a best of 131* . He scored 1432 runs and took 71 wickets in the one day arena. He went on to play Minor county cricket for Cumberland.

References

1953 births
Living people
English cricketers
Lancashire cricketers
Cumberland cricketers
People from Whalley, Lancashire